Steven Lynn Neils (born May 2, 1951) is a former linebacker in the National Football League who played his entire career for the St. Louis Cardinals.  After a college career at Minnesota, Steve was drafted in the fifth round of the 1974 NFL draft.

Over eighty-eight professional games, he had one interception and seven recovered fumbles, running one back 72 yards for a touchdown.

References

1951 births
Living people
People from St. Peter, Minnesota
American football linebackers
Minnesota Golden Gophers football players
St. Louis Cardinals (football) players
Players of American football from Minnesota